Emily Marjata Dorothea Grundy,  (born 24 July 1955) is a British demographer and academic, specialising in ageing and health inequalities. Since 2013, she has been Professor of Demography at the London School of Economics and Political Science (LSE). She was previously Professor of Demographic Gerontology at the London School of Hygiene and Tropical Medicine (LSHTM) from 2003 to 2012, and Professor of Demography at the University of Cambridge from 2012 to 2013. From October 2017, she will be Professor of Population Science and Director of the Institute for Social and Economic Research at the University of Essex.

Honours
In October 2016, Grundy was elected Fellow of the Academy of Social Sciences (FAcSS). In July 2017, she was elected a Fellow of the British Academy (FBA), the United Kingdom's national academy for the humanities and social sciences.

Selected works

References

1955 births
Living people
British demographers
British gerontologists
Academics of the London School of Economics
Academics of the London School of Hygiene & Tropical Medicine
Academics of the University of Cambridge
Fellows of the British Academy
Fellows of the Academy of Social Sciences